Szczytno may refer to the following places:
Szczytno, Kuyavian-Pomeranian Voivodeship (north-central Poland)
Szczytno, Płock County in Masovian Voivodeship (east-central Poland)
Szczytno in Warmian-Masurian Voivodeship (north Poland)
Szczytno, Płońsk County in Masovian Voivodeship (east-central Poland)
Szczytno, Warsaw West County in Masovian Voivodeship (east-central Poland)
Szczytno, Greater Poland Voivodeship (west-central Poland)
Szczytno, Pomeranian Voivodeship (north Poland)